Max Karl Wilhelm von Gallwitz (2 May 1852 – 18 April 1937) was a German general from Breslau (Wrocław), Silesia, who served with distinction during World War I on both the Eastern and Western Fronts.

Biography

Gallwitz grew up in a Catholic family in Breslau. In 1891, he married Friedrike. They had a daughter and son Werner, who became a lieutenant general in the Second World War. Gallwitz was a First World War corps commander (Guards Reserve Corps) on the Western Front, but he was almost immediately transferred east to join the Eighth Army under Hindenburg. In 1915, he took command of Armee-Gruppe Gallwitz (later redesignated Twelfth Army) and participated in the Galicia offensive alongside Mackensen, who commanded the Eleventh Army.

Towards the end of 1915, Gallwitz succeeded Mackensen as commander of the Eleventh Army, as the latter campaigned against Serbia. In 1916, he moved back to the Western Front and defended against the British attack in the Battle of the Somme. He took over command of 2nd Army and of Heeresgruppe Gallwitz - Somme controlling the 1st and 2nd Armies. From 1916–18, he commanded the Fifth Army in the west, most notably engaging the Americans during the Battle of Saint-Mihiel.

Following his retirement from the army, Gallwitz served as a deputy in the Reichstag (1920–24) for the German National People's Party.

Awards and decorations
 Pour le Mérite (24 July 1915), Oak Leaves added on 28 September 1915
 Grand Cross of the Order of the Red Eagle
 Order of the Black Eagle (23 December 1917)
 Iron Cross First and Second class

References
Notes

Bibliography

Sources

External links
 

1852 births
1937 deaths
Military personnel from Wrocław
People from the Province of Silesia
German military personnel of the Franco-Prussian War
German untitled nobility
German Army generals of World War I
German Roman Catholics
Generals of Artillery (Prussia)
German monarchists
Members of the Reichstag of the Weimar Republic
Recipients of the Pour le Mérite (military class)